Movimiento Antorchista Nacional or Antorcha Campesina (National Torch Movement or Torch of the Peasantry)
 is a Mexican political organization whose main objective is the eradication of poverty in Mexico. It has been repeatedly accused of corruption, though no indictments have been reported. It was founded in 1974 in the town of Tecomatlán, located in the poor region of the Mixteca Baja, in the state of Puebla, by a group of 40 college students and peasants led by agronomist Aquiles Córdova Morán, current Secretary General of the Movement. It has a strong national presence among the most popular sectors of the population, including students and peasants. In 2014, it has been bringing out numerous major events crosswide the country as part of the celebrations for its 40th anniversary. The greatest of these events was held at the Estadio Azteca in Mexico City, with an estimated attendance of 100,000 people. It is an independent popular movement that does not receive any resources neither by political parties, business institutions, or government agencies. It is financed by contributions from its political members and a network of small businesses. In October 1988 the movement adhered to the Institutional Revolutionary Party (PRI). However, in 2016 they announced that they would create their own party, since their moral code was always different from that of the PRI. They have protested against Andrés Manuel López Obrador government mainly because of the cuts it made to the 2020 federal budget expenditures. They also protested against the PRI in the Valley of Mexico, calling for food programs for poor families.

References

External links

Political organizations based in Mexico